Prachinburi (officially, Prachin Buri) may refer to
Prachinburi, a town
Prachinburi Province
Mueang Prachinburi district
Prachin Buri River
Monthon Prachinburi